Glen Black is a  New Zealand former rugby league referee. An international referee, Black has also controlled Canterbury Rugby League, New Zealand Rugby League and Super League matches.

International career
Black was the New Zealand Rugby League's nomination in both the 2004 and 2005 Tri-Nations. Before each of these tournaments Black controlled several matches in the Super League competition.

In 2004 his appointment to the Australia v Great Britain match was initially criticised by Australian coach Wayne Bennett, however after the match Bennett was happy with Blacks performance and said he would be happy to have him control them again.

He was named the New Zealand Rugby League's 2004 Referee of the year.

References

Year of birth missing (living people)
Living people
New Zealand rugby league referees